Arrow's impossibility theorem, the general possibility theorem or Arrow's paradox is an impossibility theorem in social choice theory that states that when voters have three or more distinct alternatives (options), no ranked voting electoral system can convert the ranked preferences of individuals into a community-wide (complete and transitive) ranking while also meeting the specified set of criteria: unrestricted domain, non-dictatorship, Pareto efficiency, and independence of irrelevant alternatives. The theorem is often cited in discussions of voting theory as it is further interpreted by the Gibbard–Satterthwaite theorem. The theorem is named after economist and Nobel laureate Kenneth Arrow, who demonstrated the theorem in his doctoral thesis and popularized it in his 1951 book Social Choice and Individual Values.  The original paper was titled "A Difficulty in the Concept of Social Welfare".

In short, the theorem states that no rank-order electoral system can be designed that always satisfies these three "fairness" criteria:

 If every voter prefers alternative X over alternative Y, then the group prefers X over Y.
 If every voter's preference between X and Y remains unchanged, then the group's preference between X and Y will also remain unchanged (even if voters' preferences between other pairs like X and Z, Y and Z, or Z and W change).
 There is no "dictator": no single voter possesses the power to always determine the group's preference.

Cardinal voting electoral systems are not covered by the theorem, as they convey more information than rank orders. Gibbard's theorem and the Duggan–Schwartz theorem show that strategic voting remains a problem. The axiomatic approach Arrow adopted can treat all conceivable rules (that are based on preferences) within one unified framework. In that sense, the approach is qualitatively different from the earlier one in voting theory, in which rules were investigated one by one. One can therefore say that the contemporary paradigm of social choice theory started from this theorem.

The practical consequences of the theorem are debatable. Arrow has said: "Most systems are not going to work badly all of the time. All I proved is that all can work badly at times." When asked what he would change about US elections, he said, "The first thing that I'd certainly do is go to a system where people ranked all the candidates."

Statement 
The need to aggregate preferences occurs in many disciplines: in welfare economics, where one attempts to find an economic outcome which would be acceptable and stable; in decision theory, where a person has to make a rational choice based on several criteria; and most naturally in electoral systems, which are mechanisms for extracting a governance-related decision from a multitude of voters' preferences.

The framework for Arrow's theorem assumes that we need to extract a preference order on a given set of options (outcomes). Each individual in the society (or equivalently, each decision criterion) gives a particular order of preferences on the set of outcomes. We are searching for a ranked voting electoral system, called a social welfare function (preference aggregation rule), which transforms the set of preferences (profile of preferences) into a single global societal preference order. Arrow's theorem says that if the decision-making body has at least two members and at least three options to decide among, then it is impossible to design a social welfare function that satisfies all these conditions (assumed to be a reasonable requirement of a fair electoral system) at once:
 Non-dictatorship The social welfare function should account for the wishes of multiple voters. It cannot simply mimic the preferences of a single voter.
 Unrestricted domain, or universality For any set of individual voter preferences, the social welfare function should yield a unique and complete ranking of societal choices. Thus:
 Independence of irrelevant alternatives (IIA) The social preference between x and y should depend only on the individual preferences between x and y (pairwise independence). More generally, changes in individuals' rankings of irrelevant alternatives (ones outside a certain subset) should have no impact on the societal ranking of the subset. For example, if candidate x ranks socially before candidate y, then x should rank socially before y even if a third candidate z is removed from participation. (See Remarks below.)
 Monotonicity, or positive association of social and individual values If any individual modifies his or her preference order by promoting a certain option, then the societal preference order should respond only by promoting that same option or not changing, never by placing it lower than before. An individual should not be able to hurt an option by ranking it higher.
 Non-imposition, or citizen sovereignty Every possible societal preference order should be achievable by some set of individual preference orders. This means that the social welfare function is surjective: It has an unrestricted target space.

A later (1963) version of Arrow's theorem replaced the monotonicity and non-imposition criteria with:
 Pareto efficiency, or unanimity If every individual prefers a certain option to another, then so must the resulting societal preference order. This, again, is a demand that the social welfare function will be minimally sensitive to the preference profile.

This later version is more general, having weaker conditions. The axioms of monotonicity, non-imposition, and IIA together imply Pareto efficiency, whereas Pareto efficiency (itself implying non-imposition) and IIA together do not imply monotonicity.

Independence of irrelevant alternatives (IIA)
The IIA condition has three purposes (or effects):
Normative Irrelevant alternatives should not matter.
Practical Use of minimal information.
Strategic Providing the right incentives for the truthful revelation of individual preferences. Though the strategic property is conceptually different from IIA, it is closely related.

Arrow's death-of-a-candidate example (1963, page 26) suggests that the agenda (the set of feasible alternatives) shrinks from, say, X = {a, b, c} to S = {a, b} because of the death of candidate c. This example is misleading since it can give the reader an impression that IIA is a condition involving two agenda and one profile. The fact is that IIA involves just one agendum ({x, y} in case of pairwise independence) but two profiles. If the condition is applied to this confusing example, it requires this: Suppose an aggregation rule satisfying IIA chooses b from the agenda {a, b} when the profile is given by (cab, cba), that is, individual 1 prefers c to a to b, 2 prefers c to b to a. Then, it must still choose b from {a, b} if the profile were, say: (abc, bac); (acb, bca); (acb, cba); or (abc, cba).

In different words, Arrow defines IIA as saying that the social preferences between alternatives x and y depend only on the individual preferences between x and y (not on those involving other candidates).

Formal statement of the theorem 
Let  be a set of outcomes,  a number of voters or decision criteria.

A (strict) social welfare function (preference aggregation rule) is a function

An -tuple  of voters' preferences is called a preference profile.  In its strongest and simplest form, Arrow's impossibility theorem states that whenever the set  of possible alternatives has more than 2 elements, then the following three conditions become incompatible:

(Unanimity implies non-imposition.)
 Non-dictatorship There is no individual,  whose strict preferences always prevail.

Proof by the pivotal voter 
Proofs using the concept of the pivotal voter originated from. The proof given here is a simplified version based on two proofs published in Economic Theory.

We will prove that any social choice system respecting unrestricted domain, unanimity, and independence of irrelevant alternatives (IIA) is a dictatorship. The key idea is to identify a pivotal voter whose ballot swings the societal outcome.  We then prove that this voter is a partial dictator (in a specific technical sense, described below).  Finally we conclude by showing that all of the partial dictators are the same person, hence this voter is a dictator.

For simplicity we have presented all rankings as if there are no ties.  A complete proof taking possible ties into account is not essentially different from the one given here, except that one ought to say "not above" instead of "below" or "not below" instead of "above" in some cases. Full details are given in the original articles.

Part one: There is a "pivotal" voter for B over A 

Say there are three choices for society, call them A, B, and C.  Suppose first that everyone prefers option B the least: everyone prefers  A to B, and everyone prefers C to B.  By unanimity, society must also prefer both A and C to B.  Call this situation profile 0.

On the other hand, if everyone preferred B to everything else, then society would have to prefer B to everything else by unanimity.  Now arrange all the voters in some arbitrary but fixed order, and for each i let profile i be the same as profile 0, but move B to the top of the ballots for voters 1 through i.  So profile 1 has B at the top of the ballot for voter 1, but not for any of the others.  Profile 2 has B at the top for voters 1 and 2, but no others, and so on.

Since B eventually moves to the top of the societal preference, there must be some profile, number k, for which B first moves above A in the societal rank. We call the voter k whose ballot change causes this to happen the pivotal voter for B over A.  Note that the pivotal voter for B over A is not, a priori, the same as the pivotal voter for A over B.  In part three of the proof we will show that these do turn out to be the same.

Also note that by IIA the same argument applies if profile 0 is any profile in which A is ranked above B by every voter, and the pivotal voter for B over A will still be voter k.  We will use this observation below.

Part two: The pivotal voter for B over A is a dictator for B over C 
In this part of the argument we refer to voter k, the pivotal voter for B over A, as the pivotal voter for simplicity.  We will show that the pivotal voter dictates society's decision for B over C.  That is, we show that no matter how the rest of society votes, if pivotal voter ranks B over C, then that is the societal outcome.  Note again that the dictator for B over C is not a priori the same as that for C over B.  In part three of the proof we will see that these turn out to be the same too.

In the following, we call voters 1 through k − 1, segment one, and voters k + 1 through N, segment two.  To begin, suppose that the ballots are as follows:
 Every voter in segment one ranks B above C and C above A.
 Pivotal voter ranks A above B and B above C.
 Every voter in segment two ranks A above B and B above C.

Then by the argument in part one (and the last observation in that part), the societal outcome must rank A above B.  This is because, except for a repositioning of C, this profile is the same as profile k − 1 from part one.  Furthermore, by unanimity the societal outcome must rank B above C.  Therefore, we know the outcome in this case completely.

Now suppose that pivotal voter moves B above A, but keeps C in the same position and imagine that any number (even all!) of the other voters change their ballots to move B below C, without changing the position of A.    Then aside from a repositioning of C this is the same as profile k from part one and hence the societal outcome ranks B above A.  Furthermore, by IIA the societal outcome must rank A above C, as in the previous case.  In particular, the societal outcome ranks B above C, even though Pivotal Voter may have been the only voter to rank B above C.  By IIA, this conclusion holds independently of how A is positioned on the ballots, so pivotal voter is a dictator for B over C.

Part three: There exists a dictator 

In this part of the argument we refer back to the original ordering of voters, and compare the positions of the different pivotal voters (identified by applying parts one and two to the other pairs of candidates).  First, the pivotal voter for B over C must appear earlier (or at the same position) in the line than the dictator for B over C:  As we consider the argument of part one applied to B and C, successively moving B to the top of voters' ballots, the pivot point where society ranks B above C must come at or before we reach the dictator for B over C.  Likewise, reversing the roles of B and C, the pivotal voter for C over B must be at or later in line than the dictator for B over C.  In short, if kX/Y denotes the position of the pivotal voter for X over Y (for any two candidates X and Y), then we have shown
kB/C ≤ kB/A ≤ kC/B.

Now repeating the entire argument above with B and C switched, we also have
kC/B ≤ kB/C.

Therefore, we have
kB/C = kB/A = kC/B

and the same argument for other pairs shows that all the pivotal voters (and hence all the dictators) occur at the same position in the list of voters.  This voter is the dictator for the whole election.

Proof by decisive coalitions 
The above proof using pivotal voters is a newer proof. Arrow's proof used the concept of decisive coalitions.

Definition: 
 A subset of voters is a coalition. 
 A coalition is decisive over an ordered pair  iff when everyone in the coalition ranks , then  overall.
 A coalition is decisive iff it is decisive over all ordered pairs.

The following proof is a simplification taken from (Sen, 2014) and (Rubinstein, 2012). The simplified proof uses an addition concept: 
 A coalition is weakly decisive over  iff when every voter  in the coalition ranks , and every voter  outside the coalition ranks , then .

Thenceforth assume that the social choice system satisfies unrestricted domain, Pareto efficiency, and IIA. Also assume that there are at least 3 distinct outcomes.

By Pareto, the entire set of voters is decisive, thus by group contraction lemma, there is a size-one decisive coalition — a dictator.

Interpretations 

Although Arrow's theorem is a mathematical result, it is often expressed in a non-mathematical way with a statement such as no voting method is fair, every ranked voting method is flawed, or the only voting method that is not flawed is a dictatorship. These statements are simplifications of Arrow's result which are not universally considered to be true. What Arrow's theorem does state is that a deterministic preferential voting mechanism—that is, one where a preference order is the only information in a vote, and any possible set of votes gives a unique result—cannot comply with all of the conditions given above simultaneously.

Various theorists have suggested weakening the IIA criterion as a way out of the paradox. Proponents of ranked voting methods contend that the IIA is an unreasonably strong criterion.  It is the one breached in most useful electoral systems. Advocates of this position point out that failure of the standard IIA criterion is trivially implied by the possibility of cyclic preferences. If voters cast ballots as follows:
 1 vote for A > B > C
 1 vote for B > C > A
 1 vote for C > A > B
then the pairwise majority preference of the group is that A wins over B, B wins over C, and C wins over A: these yield rock-paper-scissors preferences for any pairwise comparison.  In this circumstance, any aggregation rule that satisfies the very basic majoritarian requirement that a candidate who receives a majority of votes must win the election, will fail the IIA criterion, if social preference is required to be transitive (or acyclic).  To see this, suppose that such a rule satisfies IIA.  Since majority preferences are respected, the society prefers A to B (two votes for A > B and one for B > A), B to C, and C to A.  Thus a cycle is generated, which contradicts the assumption that social preference is transitive.

So, what Arrow's theorem really shows is that any majority-wins electoral system is a non-trivial game, and that game theory should be used to predict the outcome of most voting mechanisms. This could be seen as a discouraging result, because a game need not have efficient equilibria; e.g., a ballot could result in an alternative nobody really wanted in the first place, yet everybody voted for.

Remark: Scalar rankings from a vector of attributes and the IIA property
The IIA property might not be satisfied in human decision-making of realistic  complexity because the scalar preference ranking is effectively derived from the weighting—not usually explicit—of a vector of attributes (one book dealing with the Arrow theorem invites the reader to consider the related problem of creating a scalar measure for the track and field decathlon event—e.g. how does one make scoring 600 points in the discus event "commensurable" with scoring 600 points in the 1500 m race) and this scalar ranking can depend sensitively on the weighting of different attributes, with the tacit weighting itself affected by the context and contrast created by apparently "irrelevant" choices.  Edward MacNeal discusses this sensitivity problem with respect to the ranking of "most livable city" in the chapter "Surveys" of his book MathSemantics: making numbers talk sense (1994).

Alternatives based on functions of preference profiles 
In an attempt to escape from the negative conclusion of Arrow's theorem, social choice theorists have investigated various possibilities ("ways out"). This section includes approaches that deal with
 aggregation rules (functions that map each preference profile into a social preference), and
 other functions, such as functions that map each preference profile into an alternative.
Since these two approaches often overlap, we discuss them at the same time. What is characteristic of these approaches is that they investigate various possibilities by eliminating or weakening or replacing one or more conditions (criteria) that Arrow imposed.

Infinitely many individuals 
Several theorists (e.g., Fishburn and Kirman and Sondermann) point out that when one drops the assumption that there are only finitely many individuals, one can find aggregation rules that satisfy all of Arrow's other conditions.

However, such aggregation rules are practically of limited interest, since they are based on ultrafilters, highly non-constructive mathematical objects. In particular, Kirman and Sondermann argue that there is an "invisible dictator" behind such a rule. Mihara shows that such a rule violates algorithmic computability. These results can be seen to establish the robustness of Arrow's theorem.

On the other hand, the ultrafilters (indeed, constructing them in an infinite model relies on the axiom of choice) are inherent in finite models as well (with no need of the axiom of choice).
They can be interpreted as decisive hierarchies, with the only difference that the hierarchy's top level - Arrow's dictator - always exists in a finite model but can be unattainable (= missing) in an infinite hierarchy. 
In the latter case, the "invisible dictator" is nothing else but the infinite decisive hierarchy itself.
If desired, it can be complemented with a limit point, which then becomes a "visible dictator".
Since dictators are inseparable from decisive hierarchies, the Dictatorship prohibition automatically prohibits decisive hierarchies, which is much less self-evident than the Dictatorship prohibition.
See also paragraph "Relaxing the Dictatorship prohibition".

Limiting the number of alternatives 
When there are only two alternatives to choose from, May's theorem shows that only simple majority rule satisfies a certain set of criteria (e.g., equal treatment of individuals and of alternatives; increased support for a winning alternative should not make it into a losing one). On the other hand, when there are at least three alternatives, Arrow's theorem points out the difficulty of collective decision making. Why is there such a sharp difference between the case of less than three alternatives and that of at least three alternatives?

Nakamura's theorem (about the core of simple games) gives an answer more generally. It establishes that if the number of alternatives is less than a certain integer called the Nakamura number, then the rule in question will identify "best" alternatives without any problem; if the number of alternatives is greater or equal to the Nakamura number, then the rule will not always work, since for some profile a voting paradox (a cycle such as alternative A socially preferred to alternative B, B to C, and C to A) will arise. Since the Nakamura number of majority rule is 3 (except the case of four individuals), one can conclude from Nakamura's theorem that majority rule can deal with up to two alternatives rationally. Some super-majority rules (such as those requiring 2/3 of the votes) can have a Nakamura number greater than 3, but such rules violate other conditions given by Arrow.

Pairwise voting 
A common way "around" Arrow's paradox is limiting the alternative set to two alternatives. Thus, whenever more than two alternatives should be put to the test, it seems very tempting to use a mechanism that pairs them and votes by pairs. As tempting as this mechanism seems at first glance, it is generally far from satisfying even Pareto efficiency, not to mention IIA. The specific order by which the pairs are decided strongly influences the outcome. This is not necessarily a bad feature of the mechanism. Many sports use the tournament mechanism—essentially a pairing mechanism—to choose a winner.  This gives considerable opportunity for weaker teams to win, thus adding interest and tension throughout the tournament. This means that the person controlling the order by which the choices are paired (the agenda maker) has great control over the outcome. In any case, when viewing the entire voting process as one game, Arrow's theorem still applies.

Domain restrictions 
Another approach is relaxing the universality condition, which means restricting the domain of aggregation rules. The best-known result along this line assumes "single peaked" preferences.

Duncan Black has shown that if there is only one dimension on which every individual has a "single-peaked" preference, then all of Arrow's conditions are met by majority rule. Suppose that there is some predetermined linear ordering of the alternative set. An individual's preference is single-peaked with respect to this ordering if he has some special place that he likes best along that line, and his dislike for an alternative grows larger as the alternative goes further away from that spot (i.e., the graph of his utility function has a single peak if alternatives are placed according to the linear ordering on the horizontal axis).  For example, if voters were voting on where to set the volume for music, it would be reasonable to assume that each voter had their own ideal volume preference and that as the volume got progressively too loud or too quiet they would be increasingly dissatisfied.
If the domain is restricted to profiles in which every individual has a single peaked preference with respect to the linear ordering, then simple aggregation rules, which include majority rule, have an acyclic (defined below) social preference, hence "best" alternative. In particular, when there are odd number of individuals, then the social preference becomes transitive, and the socially "best" alternative is equal to the median of all the peaks of the individuals (Black's median voter theorem). Under single-peaked preferences, the majority rule is in some respects the most natural voting mechanism.

One can define the notion of "single-peaked" preferences on higher-dimensional sets of alternatives. However, one can identify the "median" of the peaks only in exceptional cases. Instead, we typically have the destructive situation suggested by McKelvey's Chaos Theorem: for any x and y, one can find a sequence of alternatives such that x is beaten by x1 by a majority, x1 by x2, up to xk by y.

Relaxing transitivity 
By relaxing the transitivity of social preferences, we can find aggregation rules that satisfy Arrow's other conditions. If we impose neutrality (equal treatment of alternatives) on such rules, however, there exists an individual who has a "veto". So the possibility provided by this approach is also very limited.

Then, there do exist non-dictatorial aggregation rules satisfying Arrow's conditions, but such rules are oligarchic. This means that there exists a coalition L such that L is decisive (if every member in L prefers x to y, then the society prefers x to y), and each member in L has a veto (if she prefers x to y, then the society cannot prefer y to x).

Second, suppose that a social preference is acyclic (instead of transitive): there do not exist alternatives  that form a cycle. Then, provided that there are at least as many alternatives as individuals, an aggregation rule satisfying Arrow's other conditions is collegial. This means that there are individuals who belong to the intersection ("collegium") of all decisive coalitions. If there is someone who has a veto, then he belongs to the collegium. If the rule is assumed to be neutral, then it does have someone who has a veto.

Finally, Brown's theorem left open the case of acyclic social preferences where the number of alternatives is less than the number of individuals. One can give a definite answer for that case using the Nakamura number.  See limiting the number of alternatives.

Relaxing assumption IIA 
There are numerous examples of aggregation rules satisfying Arrow's conditions except IIA. The Borda rule is one of them. These rules, however, are susceptible to strategic manipulation by individuals.

See also Interpretations of the theorem above.

Relaxing the Pareto criterion 
Wilson (1972) shows that if an aggregation rule is non-imposed and non-null, then there is either a dictator or an inverse dictator, provided that Arrow's conditions other than Pareto are also satisfied. Here, an inverse dictator is an individual i such that whenever i prefers x to y, then the society prefers y to x.

Amartya Sen offered both relaxation of transitivity and removal of the Pareto principle. He demonstrated another interesting impossibility result, known as the "impossibility of the Paretian Liberal" (see liberal paradox for details). Sen went on to argue that this demonstrates the futility of demanding Pareto optimality in relation to voting mechanisms.

Relaxing the dictatorship prohibition 
Andranik Tangian (2010) introduced measures of dictator's "representativeness", for instance, the "popularity index" defined as the average size of the social group whose pairwise preferences are shared (that is, represented) by the dictator, averaged over all pairs of alternatives and all preference profiles. It was shown that there always exist "good" Arrow's dictators who on the average represent a majority. Since they are rather representatives of the society - like democratically elected  presidents - there are no self-evident reasons to prohibit them. Restricting the notion of dictator to "bad" ones only, i.e. those who on the average represent a minority, Arrow's axioms were proven to be consistent.

Social choice instead of social preference 
In social decision making, to rank all alternatives is not usually a goal.  It often suffices to find some alternative. The approach focusing on choosing an alternative investigates either social choice functions (functions that map each preference profile into an alternative) or social choice rules (functions that map each preference profile into a subset of alternatives).

As for social choice functions, the Gibbard–Satterthwaite theorem is well-known, which states that if a social choice function whose range contains at least three alternatives is strategy-proof, then it is dictatorial.

As for social choice rules, we should assume there is a social preference behind them. That is, we should regard a rule as choosing the maximal elements ("best" alternatives) of some social preference. The set of maximal elements of a social preference is called the core. Conditions for existence of an alternative in the core have been investigated in two approaches. The first approach assumes that preferences are at least acyclic (which is necessary and sufficient for the preferences to have a maximal element on any finite subset).  For this reason, it is closely related to relaxing transitivity. The second approach drops the assumption of acyclic preferences. Kumabe and Mihara adopt this approach. They make a more direct assumption that individual preferences have maximal elements, and examine conditions for the social preference to have a maximal element. See Nakamura number for details of these two approaches.

Other alternatives 

Arrow originally rejected cardinal utility as a meaningful tool for expressing social welfare, and so focused his theorem on preference rankings, but later stated that a cardinal score system with three or four classes "is probably the best".

Arrow's framework assumes that individual and social preferences are "orderings" (i.e., satisfy completeness and transitivity) on the set of alternatives. This means that if the preferences are represented by a utility function, its value is an ordinal utility in the sense that it is meaningful so far as the greater value indicates the better alternative. For instance, having ordinal utilities of 4, 3, 2, 1 for alternatives a, b, c, d, respectively, is the same as having 1000, 100.01, 100, 0, which in turn is the same as having 99, 98, 1, .997. They all represent the ordering in which a is preferred to b to c to d. The assumption of ordinal preferences, which precludes interpersonal comparisons of utility, is an integral part of Arrow's theorem.

For various reasons, an approach based on cardinal utility, where the utility has a meaning beyond just giving a ranking of alternatives, is not common in contemporary economics. However, once one adopts that approach, one can take intensities of preferences into consideration, or one can compare (i) gains and losses of utility or (ii) levels of utility, across different individuals. In particular, Harsanyi (1955) gives a justification of utilitarianism (which evaluates alternatives in terms of the sum of individual utilities), originating from Jeremy Bentham. Hammond (1976) gives a justification of the maximin principle (which evaluates alternatives in terms of the utility of the worst-off individual), originating from John Rawls.

Not all voting methods use, as input, only an ordering of all candidates. Methods which do not, often called "rated" or "cardinal" (as opposed to "ranked", "ordinal", or "preferential") electoral system, can be viewed as using information that only cardinal utility can convey. In that case, it is not surprising if some of them satisfy all of Arrow's conditions that are reformulated.
Range voting is such a method.
Whether such a claim is correct depends on how each condition is reformulated. Other rated electoral system which pass certain generalizations of Arrow's criteria include approval voting and majority judgment. Note that Arrow's theorem does not apply to single-winner methods such as these, but Gibbard's theorem still does: no non-defective electoral system is fully strategy-free, so the informal dictum that "no electoral system is perfect" still has a mathematical basis.

Finally, though not an approach investigating some kind of rules, there is a criticism by James M. Buchanan, Charles Plott, and others. It argues that it is silly to think that there might be social preferences that are analogous to individual preferences. Arrow (1963, Chapter 8) answers this sort of criticism seen in the early period, which come at least partly from misunderstanding.

See also 

 Condorcet paradox
 Gibbard's theorem
 Holmström's theorem
 Market failure
 Voting paradox
 Comparison of electoral systems

References

Further reading 
  Surveys many of approaches discussed in #Alternatives based on functions of preference profiles.
  preprint.
 
 . The chapter "Defining Rationality: Personal and Group Decision Making" has a detailed discussion of the Arrow Theorem, with proof.
  Gives explicit examples of preference rankings and apparently anomalous results under different electoral system.  States but does not prove Arrow's theorem.

External links 

 A proof by Terence Tao, assuming a much stronger version of non-dictatorship

Voting theory
Economics theorems
Paradoxes in economics
Theorems in discrete mathematics
Decision-making paradoxes
Social choice theory